António Mascarenhas was an Indian writer from the region of Goa. He is best remembered as the author of the book Goa from Prehistoric Times (1987). He wrote in the English language.

Life 

António Mascarenhas was born at his mother's ancestral home in Divar, Goa, India, on 24 February 1916. He was baptized as Antonio Inacio Salvador Matias Mascarenhas and spent his early childhood in Zanzibar and his school years at St. Paul's School, Belgaum, after which he joined the Society of Jesus.

He completed the Gregorian University Ph L summa cum laude. Although he remained a layman, later marrying and raising a family, he was philosophically a Jesuit.

His work took him between India and Portugal and among teaching, real estate, radio, travel planning and writing. He died in 1993 at home in Miraton Gardens, Chicalim, Goa, and was buried on the Jesuit feast day.

Works 

Among his known works are the following.

Poems 
 Poems (Tipografia Rangel, Bastora, Goa, c. 1984)

Collected radio talks 
 Glimpses of the Goan Past (? c. 1958)
 Essays for Diplomats on the Case of Goa (Edições Paulistas, Lumiar, Lisboa, c. 1958)
 A Critique of Sir S Radhakrishnan's 'Basis for Human Fellowship (Edições Paulistas, Lumiar, Lisboa, 1959) 
 Goan Life and Outlook (? c. 1960) 
 An Introduction to Goan Folksongs, Volume 1 ([year unknown] Centro Cultural Goês, Lisboa) which also appeared in a translation by Maria Suzette Carvalho and Tony Mascarenhas (the author's nephew) under the title Dulpodam (c. 1960, Centro Cultural Goês, Lisboa). 
 Introduction to An Introduction to Goan Folksongs, Volume 2, Mande which appeared in Portuguese as Poesias do Povo Goês by Maria da Paz Cabrita de Barros Santos and Jesuino de Noronha (c. 1960, Centro Cultural Goês, Lisboa).

Travel guides 

 Open Sesame, Lisbon! (Edições Paulistas, Lumiar, Lisboa, no date printed) 
 Open Sesame, Fátima! (Edições Paulistas, Lumiar, Lisboa, no date printed)
 To Fátima and There. Text and photography by the author (? self-published)
 Fátima, A Shrine of Luminous Silence (Edições Francisco Mas, Lisboa, 1967)

Biography 

 Father Joseph Vaz of Sancoale (Self-published, Goa, c. 1980)

Language 

 A Concise Konkani Grammar (Tipografia Rangel, Bastora, Goa, 1984)

History 

 A Tourist's History of Goa (Instituto Menezes Bragança, Panjim, Goa, 1981)
 Goa from Prehistoric Times (Self-published, Goa, 1987)

References

Sources
 Universidade de Aveiro | Fundação Portugal-Africa [1997-2015] http://memoria-africa.ua.pt/Catalog.aspx?q=AU%20mascarenhas,%20antonio
 Carlos A. Moreira Azevedo, ed., Bibliografia para a História da Igreja em Portugal (1961-2000), Centro de Estudos de História Religiosa, Lisboa, 2013, 
 Thomas Paul Urumpackal, Organized Religion According to Dr. S. Radhakrishnan, Università Gregoriana Editrice, Roma, 1972
 Robert Neil Minor, Radhakrishnan: A Religious Biography, State University of New York Press, 1987. 
 Bibliography, Luso-Brazilian Review, Vol. 6, No. 2 (Winter, 1969), pp. 104–115, University of Wisconsin Press. https://www.jstor.org/stable/3512742
 SP Agrawal, Rajeev Kumar Sharma, Government and Politics in India: A Bibliographical Study, Concept Publishing, New Delhi, 1993. 

Writers from Goa
1916 births
1993 deaths